The ruby-cheeked sunbird (Chalcoparia singalensis) is a species of sunbird in the family Nectariniidae.

Distribution and habitat
It is found in Bangladesh, Bhutan, Brunei, Cambodia, China, India, Indonesia, Laos, Malaysia, Myanmar, Nepal, Thailand, and Vietnam.  Its natural habitats are subtropical or tropical moist lowland forest, subtropical or tropical mangrove forest, and subtropical or tropical moist montane forest.

Taxonomy
A number of subspecies are recognized:

References

ruby-cheeked sunbird
Birds of Northeast India
Birds of Bangladesh
Birds of Southeast Asia
ruby-cheeked sunbird
ruby-cheeked sunbird
Taxonomy articles created by Polbot